"My Twelve Tone Melody" is a 1988 composition by Leonard Bernstein written in tribute to Irving Berlin in celebration of Berlin's 100th birthday. It was performed by Bernstein at the concert to celebrate Berlin's birthday at Carnegie Hall in May 1988.

The piece was poorly received by Berlin's family at the concert, Bernstein's biographer, Joan Peyser, described it as a "dour, mean little piece" and that the piece could be interpreted as a "shot fired in a battle" between "late twentieth-century masters". Bernstein was the only performer at the concert not to perform one of Berlin's compositions.

The piece is written in the twelve-tone technique and adapts Berlin's songs "Always" and "Russian Lullaby". Bernstein remembered "Russian Lullaby" from his youth.

The piece is two minutes in length.

References

External links
, Jessica Laeger, soprano and Janet Scovill, piano

1988 compositions
Songs with music by Leonard Bernstein
Irving Berlin